The School for Scandal is a 1930 British historical comedy film directed by Thorold Dickinson and Maurice Elvey and starring Basil Gill, Madeleine Carroll and Ian Fleming. It is the first sound film adaptation of Richard Brinsley Sheridan's play The School for Scandal. It is also the only feature-length film shot using the unsuccessful Raycol colour process, and marked the screen debut of Sally Gray.
The film was shot at the Elstree Studios of British International Pictures with sets designed by the art director Lawrence P. Williams. It ended up being released as a second feature and is classified as a quota quickie.

The British Film Institute has placed it on the BFI 75 Most Wanted list of lost films.

Cast
 Basil Gill as Sir Peter Teazle
 Madeleine Carroll as Lady Teazle
 Ian Fleming as Joseph Surface
 Henry Hewitt as  Charles Surface
 Edgar K. Bruce as Sir Oliver Surface
 Hayden Coffin as Sir Harry Bumper
 Hector Abbas as Moses
 Dodo Watts as Maria
 Anne Grey as Lady Sneerwell
 John Charlton as Benjamin Backbite
 Stanley Lathbury as Crabtree
 Henry Vibart as Squire Hunter
 May Agate as Mrs. Candour
 Maurice Braddell as Careless
 Gibb McLaughlin as William
 Wallace Bosco as Rawley
 Sally Gray as Bit Part
 Rex Harrison as  Bit Part
 Anna Neagle as Bit Part

References

Bibliography
 Chibnall, Steve. Quota Quickies: The Birth of the British 'B' Film. British Film Institute, 2007.
 Low, Rachael. Filmmaking in 1930s Britain. George Allen & Unwin, 1985.
 Wood, Linda. British Films, 1927-1939. British Film Institute, 1986.

External links
BFI 75 Most Wanted entry, with extensive notes

1930 films
1930s color films
1930 lost films
1930s English-language films
British films based on plays
Films directed by Maurice Elvey
Lost British films
Lost comedy films
British historical comedy films
1930s historical comedy films
Films set in the 18th century
Quota quickies
Films shot at British International Pictures Studios
Paramount Pictures films
1930s British films